Saint Conleth (Modern Irish: Naomh Connlaodh; also Conlaeth; Conlaid; Conlaith; Conlath; Conlian, Hugh the Wise) was an Irish hermit and metalworker, also said to have been a copyist and skilled illuminator of manuscripts. He is believed to have come from the Wicklow area.

Life

While living in seclusion at Old Connell on the River Liffey in what is now Newbridge Conleth was persuaded by Saint Brigid to make sacred vessels for her convent. Conleth, Tassach of Elphin (Saint Patrick's craftsman), and Daigh (craftsman of Kieran of Saigher) were acclaimed the "three chief artisans of Ireland" during their period. Conleth was head of the Kildare school of metal-work and penmanship. According to Brigid's biographer, Cogitosus, a community of monks grew up which, under his guidance, excelled in the making of beautiful chalices and other metal objects needed in the church, and in the writing and ornamentation of missals, gospels, and psalters. A product of Saint Conleth's metalwork for which he is noted is the crozier that he fashioned for Saint Finbarr of Termonbarry.

The Diocese of Kildare appears to have been founded around 490, by Conleth who, with the assistance of St. Bridget, then presiding over the monastery, erected the cathedral and became first bishop. Cogitosus, in his Life of Brigid, calls him "bishop and abbot of the monks of Kildare".

Conleth died when he was attacked by wolves in the forests of Leinster on pilgrimage to Rome on 4 May 519 and was buried nearby. In 799 his relics were transported and laid beside Brigid's in the great cathedral in Kildare. His relics were finally laid to rest in Connell in 835 to protect the inhabitants from invading Danes.

Veneration
Conleth is the patron saint of the Roman Catholic St Conleth's Parish, which includes Newbridge and the surrounding areas. Old Connell – the site of Conleth's original cell, which is now a graveyard – is within the parish limits.

Conleth's feast day is 4 May. Every year on the Sunday after St Conleth's Day a pilgrimage takes place from the parish church in Newbridge to Old Connell, about two miles outside the town.

Legacy
St. Conleth's College is located in Dublin.

His tale and community are briefly described in Sabine Baring-Gould's "A Book of Cornwall" (now in the public domain,) in which his name is spelled "Conlaeth."

St. Conleth's Park is the name of Kildare GAA's home stadium, located in Newbridge, County Kildare.

References

6th-century Irish bishops
Irish Christian monks
6th-century Christian saints
Medieval Irish saints
Canonizations by Pope Leo XIII
Irish goldsmiths
Irish silversmiths
Irish metalsmiths
People from County Kildare
People from County Wicklow
519 deaths
Year of birth unknown
Bishops of Kildare
Irish artists
Deaths due to wolf attacks